The Sagara Maru was a Japanese Sakito Maru class cargo liner converted to seaplane tender that served during World War II. It was hit by torpedoes from two different submarines before being finally sunk and abandoned.

Sagara Maru was built in 1939 at the Mitsubishi Yokohoma shipyard for the Nippon Yusen company, being completed in 1940. She was the fifth of seven ships of the Sakito Maru-class of high speed transports: Sakito Maru (崎戸丸), Sanuki Maru (讃岐丸), Sado Maru (佐渡丸), Sagami Maru (相模丸), Sagara Maru (相良丸), Sasako Maru (笹子丸), and Sakura Maru (佐倉丸).

Shortly before Japan's entry into the war, she was acquired by the Imperial Japanese Navy and converted to an auxiliary seaplane tender. After hostilities commenced she was involved in the escort forces for landings at Sabang, Rangoon and the Andaman Islands, and after that spent the majority of her time patrolling and escorting convoys between Penang and Singapore. In December 1942 she was re-classified as a transport/replenishment ship.

On 23 June 1943 off the coast of Omaezaki, Japan she was spotted by USS Harder, who despite being spotted and fired upon managed to fire four torpedoes one of which hit the bow of Sagara Maru. The destroyer  took her in tow but to avoid sinking she was beached. Ten days later, on 4 July, before she can be re-floated, USS Pompano'' spotted her on radar and managed to gain two torpedo hits. She was subsequently abandoned a few days later.

References 

1939 ships
Ships sunk by American submarines